The Cutting Edge: The Magic of Movie Editing is a 2004 documentary film directed by filmmaker Wendy Apple.  The film is about the art of film editing. Clips are shown from many groundbreaking films with innovative editing styles.

Cast
Every actor, editor and director (listed alphabetically below) appears as themselves, with Bates as the narrator.

Kathy Bates
James Cameron
Rob Cohen
Wes Craven
Jodie Foster
Antony Gibbs
Mark Goldblatt
George Lucas
Sally Menke
Anthony Minghella
Walter Murch
Sean Penn
Thelma Schoonmaker
Martin Scorsese
Steven Spielberg
Zach Staenberg
Quentin Tarantino
Michael Tronick

Films examined

Life of an American Fireman (1903)
The Great Train Robbery (1903)
The Birth of a Nation (1915)
Battleship Potemkin (1925)
Man with a Movie Camera (1929) 
Triumph of the Will (1935)
The Adventures of Robin Hood (1938)
Vertigo (1958)
Psycho (1960)
Bonnie and Clyde (1967)
Bullitt (1968)
Easy Rider (1969)
The French Connection (1971)
Lenny (1974)
Jaws (1975)
The Last Tycoon (1976)
Apocalypse Now (1979)
Raging Bull (1980)
Body Heat (1981)
Places in the Heart (1984)
The Untouchables (1987)
The Silence of the Lambs (1991)
Terminator 2: Judgment Day (1991)
JFK (1991)
Grand Canyon (1991)
Reservoir Dogs (1992)
Basic Instinct (1992)
The Nightmare Before Christmas (1993)
Pulp Fiction (1994)
Under Siege 2: Dark Territory (1995)
Home for the Holidays (1995)
Scream (1996)
Dante's Peak (1997)
Titanic (1997)
Starship Troopers (1997)
Kundun (1997)
Out of Sight (1998)
Election (1999)
Sleepy Hollow (2000)
Gladiator (2000)
The Pledge (2001)
The Fast and the Furious (2001)
XXX (2002)
The Matrix Reloaded (2003)

References

External links

 
 
The New York Times Movies

2004 films
2004 documentary films
American documentary films
Documentary films about films
2000s English-language films
2000s American films